Goodrichthys is a Carboniferous genus of shark from the Glencartholm Volcanic Beds Formation (Upper Border Group) of Scotland.

References

Prehistoric cartilaginous fish genera
Carboniferous sharks